The town of Pinos is located on the southeastern end of the state of Zacatecas in the municipality of Pinos in Mexico.

References

Municipalities of Zacatecas